Sainte-Rose station is a commuter rail station operated by Exo in Laval, Quebec, Canada. It is served by  the Saint-Jérôme line.

The station is located in ARTM fare zone B, and currently has 713 parking spaces and a bus loop. Prior to the reform of the ARTM's fare structure in July 2022, it was in zone 3.

Connecting bus routes

Société de transport de Laval

References

External links
  Sainte-Rose Commuter Train Station Information (RTM)
 Sainte-Rose Commuter Train Station Schedule (RTM)
 STL 2011 map

Exo commuter rail stations
Railway stations in Laval, Quebec
Railway stations in Canada opened in 1997
1997 establishments in Quebec